Kasra (Ali) Anghaee born on 16 June 1967 is a Swiss poet and writer with Persian roots. His collection of poetry has been translated into French, English, German,Russian, Czech, Persian,Arabic, and Kurdish.

He published his first collection of poems when he was 22 years old.

Anghaee lived in many countries thus gaining a good knowledge of the international cultures and traditions he reflected his experience in his poems and stories.
He is interested in painting and other kinds of arts had a great role in his artistic life.

At present, apart from writing, he also translates the works of some great European and American poets into Persian.

Publications
1-On the stairs of an old tower (Poems), 1989
2-Legend of gypsies (Scenario), 1989
3-The gate of Ivy and mist (Poems), 1991
4-Humidity of antique potsherds (Poems), 1993
5-On the track of dragonflies (Poems), 1994
6-My cloudy father (Story for children), 1995
7-Commemorating the Finale of the Century (Poems), 2000
8-A 20 Years Selection of Iranian Love Poems (1979–1999),
9.Statue of the mist (A selection of poems, stories, plays and scenarios), 1997
10. Frozen stars (Poems), 2010
11. The secret of the soil (Poems), 2010
12. Shadows of the future (Poems), 2010
13. To sanctify the ebony (Poems), 2010
14. The leaf under the snow (Poems), 2010
15. The soil and the silk (Poems), 2010
16. Autumn in the mirror (Poems), 2010
17. Haven of the fire (Poems), 2010
18. Returning from infinity (Poems), 2010
19. The roots of the future (Poems), 2010
20. The Hidden History of the Tears (Poems and Short stories), 2011
21. Confessions (Long poems), 2014
22. Scared butterflies in the mirror (Selected short stories and poems, bilingual text: English & Czech), 2015
23. Memories of the rain (Selected short stories and poems bilingual text: Russian & French), 2015
24. Before I say "Goodbye" (Selected poems), 2020

Sources
Sources translated From Persian websites:
سایت قابیل، بخش شعر
رادیو فردا، مصاحبه با کسرا عنقایی
گفتگوی صدای آمریکا با کسرا عنقایی، شاعر معاصر
فراموش نكنيم كه روي شانه‌هاي شاعران پيشكسوت ايستاده‌ايم
Radio Farda's interview with Kasra Anghaee on internet relation with poetry. (in Persian: عنقایی: اينترنت باعث شد توهم نابغه بودن از شاعران گرفته شود)
مجموعه کتابهای كسرا عنقایی
ستاره ی نقره - کسرا عنقایی
تصويری از تقدير کسرا (Image)
سودابه آفاقی: آنگاه زن ، زمین را لمس كرد. جستجوی شخصیت زن در مجموعه شعر «سرود پایان قرن»

20th-century Iranian poets
21st-century Iranian poets